Clown Charly is a 1918 German silent film directed by Alwin Neuß and starring Lil Dagover.

Cast
 Lil Dagover
 Karl Falkenberg 
 Alwin Neuß

References

Bibliography
 Hans-Michael Bock and Tim Bergfelder. The Concise Cinegraph: An Encyclopedia of German Cinema. Berghahn Books.

External links

1918 films
Films of the German Empire
Films directed by Alwin Neuß
German silent feature films
German black-and-white films
1910s German films